The St. Tammany Miracle is a 1994 American sports drama film directed by Joy N. Houck, Jr. and Jim McCullough Sr. The film stars Mark-Paul Gosselaar and Soleil Moon Frye.

Premise
The film focuses on the basketball team of an Episcopalian all-girl high school, where they try to make a name, despite only a little funding. The team's new female coach soon realizes she will have to work very hard if she wants the team to become a success.

Cast
Mark-Paul Gosselaar as Carl
Soleil Moon Frye as Julia
Jamie Luner as Lootie
Jeffrey Meek as Father Thomas Mullberry
Julie McCullough as Kimberly
Steve Allen as Julia's grandfather

Production 
Frye occasionally showed up late on set while filming this movie and repeatedly got into arguments with her co-stars. Frye spent most nights at a local bar in Shreveport, Louisiana where the film was shot drinking and causing trouble that her private security had to get her out of. This out of control behavior was witnessed by many and recorded by security. Her personal security was also head of security at the bar her and the other stars visited almost nightly and off duty law enforcement and he has just recently stated she was the most difficult client he has ever protected and still has documentation to prove it.

References

External links

1994 films
1990s sports drama films
American basketball films
American sports drama films
Films set in Louisiana
Films shot in Louisiana
1994 drama films
1990s English-language films
Films directed by Jim McCullough Sr.
Films directed by Joy N. Houck Jr.
1990s American films